In Scandinavian mythology, the hug refers to an individual's mental life, in some contrast to the soul, a term which carries more spiritual connotations. "Hug" is the Norwegian term; the Danish term is hu, the Swedish håg; Scandinavian languages have a word for soul that is cognate with the English.

The hug is no simple concept and shows great variation, with different accounts and characteristics given in the literature from medieval literature to more recent folklore. It is central to the conception of magic, and can influence animate and inanimate objects. The hug manifests itself externally in a variety of possible forms; that of witches, for instance, sometimes took the shape of a cat.

See also
Itse (Finnish paganism)
Troll cat

References

Notes

Reference bibliography

Scandinavian folklore
Norwegian folklore
Danish folklore
Swedish folklore
European mythology